Rio Grande Review was a biannual, bilingual (Spanish and English) magazine of contemporary literature and arts established in September 1981 in El Paso, Texas. It was published by the University of Texas at El Paso and edited by students of its Creative Writing program. In 2013 forty issues were published, some of them dedicated to special topics such as aversions, violence, kitsch and camp, visual poetry and graphic narrative, among others. The magazine promoted world and border literature between Mexico and the United States.  Previous editors included Paul Guillén and Juan Pablo Plata. The magazine folded with the Fall 2012-Spring 2013 issue.

Autores en español publicados 
Sergio Ramírez
Andrés Neuman
Agustín Fernández Mallo
Ricardo Piglia
Carlos Fonseca
Alí Calderón
 Luis Arturo Ramos
 Alejandro Zambra
 Ricardo Piglia 
 Betina González
 Yuri Herrera
 Daniel Centeno
 Iván Thays
 Jon Lee Anderson
 Jaime Manrique
 Benjamin Alire Sainz (Premio Pen/Faulkner) 
 Julián Herbert

Editors 
 Margarita Mejía 
 Juan Álvarez
 Danial Ríos 
 Betina González
 Daniel Centeno
 Mijail Lamas
 Criseida Santos Guevara
 Carolina Dávila
 Mario Martz 
 Amber Miller
 Mónica Teresa Ortiz
 Andrea Salgado
 Mari Gómez
 Fabián Molina

References

External links
 

1981 establishments in Texas
2013 disestablishments in Texas
Biannual magazines published in the United States
Defunct literary magazines published in the United States
Magazines established in 1981
Magazines disestablished in 2013
Magazines published in Texas
Multilingual magazines
Spanish-language magazines
University of Texas at El Paso